Warren Kinston (born 16 May 1945) is an Australian scientist, doctor, psychoanalyst, management consultant, systems thinker and entrepreneur.

Ethical Design
Kinston pioneered the notion and practice of "ethical design," in which finding solutions to social and psychological problems require 'ingraining values into every action, every thought, every decision, every relationship.'

Taxonomy of Human Elements in Endeavour (THEE)
The application of ethical design during his career as a consultant led to the development of tools for managers called collectively the Technology of Common Sense. Pursuing this systems thinking in additional areas of personal and social life, led Kinston to develop the Taxonomy of Human Elements in Endeavour (THEE). The topics most comprehensively covered to date are "purpose" and "value" including politics, and decision and achievement including many features of management and employment.

The taxonomy architecture was discovered by specifying the universal elements of human activity that can come into consciousness in terms of their function, properties, relationships and dynamics. Structural regularities enable the prediction of as yet unspecified elements, much as occurred with the discovery of the periodic table of chemical elements. Although many parts of the Taxonomy are as yet unformulated, in 2012-2014, Kinston proposed an evolutionary basis for the discovered architecture.

In 2007, Kinston introduced THEE by invitation at the Global Organization Design Conference in Toronto, Canada. He then launched the THEE Online Project in 2008. The interactive website that went public in February 2011 makes new and emerging frameworks generally available.

Early life, education and career
Kinston was born in Brisbane, Queensland, Australia. He was educated at the University of Sydney where he completed science and medical degrees, which included neurophysiology research under Prof. P.O. Bishop. He moved to London to work at the Maudsley Hospital and obtained post-graduate qualifications in psychiatry from the University of London in 1974 and in psychoanalysis from the London Institute of Psychoanalysis in 1977.

Working in child psychiatry at Great Ormond Street Hospital (London), he was part of a small band of innovators that introduced family therapy and systems practice to the UK. He led the development of clinically grounded research methods. Within psychoanalysis, Kinston contributed to clarification of narcissism and repression from a practical and clinical standpoint.

In 1980, Kinston joined the Brunel University's Institute of Organisation and Social Studies (BIOSS) under its Director, Prof. Elliott Jaques and contributed to the development of Jaques's levels of work theory. At Brunel, Kinston founded The SIGMA Centre, a research-based consulting firm that worked in various public and private organisations, most notably the National Health Service (NHS).

In 1995, Kinston co-founded with Professor Mathew Vadas the ASX-listed biotech company, Bionomics Ltd (ASX: BNO) and in 2001, they co-founded the biotech company Cryptome Research Pty Ltd, which listed on the ASX as Cryptome Pharmaceuticals Ltd in 2003.

Publications

Many publications are in the fields of psychoanalysis and family therapy. Publications related to the development of THEE include:

 Pluralism in the organisation of health services research. Social Science and Medicine, 17 (5): 299–313. 1982
 District Health Organisation. Social Policy and Administration, 18 (3): 229–246. 1984
 Purposes and the translation of values into action. Systems Research, 3 (3): 147–160. 1986
 Stronger Nursing Organisation (London: Brunel University College, 1987) 
 A Total Framework for Inquiry. Systems Research, 4 (1): 9–26. 1988
 A Local Revolution. The House Magazine p. 6, 20 June 1988. (with David Wilshire)
 Rescuing Local Government. County Council Gazette, 81 (2): 50–52. 1988
 Stronger Political Management in Local Government: A Guide. (London: Brunel University – Political Management Program, 1988) 
 Levels of Work: New applications to management in large organisations. Journal of Applied Systems Analysis, 16:19–33. 1989 (with Ralph Rowbottom)
 Seven distinctive paths of decision and action. Systems Research, 6 (1): 117–132. 1989 (with Jimmy Algie)
 Making General Management Work in the National Health Service (London: Brunel University, 1989) with Ralph Rowbottom 
 The role of region in the post-White Paper NHS. Health Services Management, 85 (3): 110–113. 1989
 Strengthening the Management Culture (London: The Sigma Centre, 1994) 
 Working with Values: Software of the Mind (London: The Sigma Centre, 1995)

References

External links
 

1945 births
Australian scientists
Living people
Sydney Medical School alumni